Eurycheilichthys pantherinus is a species of armored catfish from the upper and middle Uruguay River basin in Brazil and Argentina. It inhabits shady, fast-flowing, shallow water, ranging from approximately 200–500 metres in elevation. The substratum is predominantly stones, with little or no macrophytes.  This species grows to a length of  SL.

References 

Azpelicueta, M. & S. Koerber (2014): First record of the hypoptopomatine genus Eurycheilichthys Reis & Schaefer, 1993 (Siluriformes, Loricariidae) from Argentina. Checklist 10 (5): 1210-1212

Otothyrinae
Catfish of South America
Freshwater fish of Argentina
Freshwater fish of Brazil
Taxa named by Roberto Esser dos Reis
Taxa named by Scott Allen Schaefer
Fish described in 1992